The Scottish Women's Football League Second Division (SWFL 2) was a division in the Scottish women's football pyramid between 1999 and 2019. The third league tier from 1999 to 2015, it later became the fourth tier. Its top teams won promotion to the SWFL First Division.

The Second Division began as a single national division, but became three regional divisions in 2008–09, the North, East and West. It was further enlarged in 2012 to four divisions. From 2016 to 2019, SWFL 2 had forty clubs in four regional divisions. The champions of each division were eligible to enter play-offs for promotion to the First Division.

In 2020, Scottish Women's Football replaced the First Division with the SWF Championship, and the Second Division took the existing name of the Scottish Women's Football League. The SWFL is now a standalone 'Recreational' league with multiple regional divisions, resembling the former Second Division, but now with no regular promotion or relegation.

History
The Second Division was initially a single national competition, played as a double round-robin.

Champions
National division champions – league level 3:
1999-00: Forfar Farmington
2000–01: Hamilton Athletic
2001–02: Hawkcraig United - 
2002–03: Falkirk L.F.C.
2003–04: Arsenal-North - 
2004–05: Inverness City - 
2005–06: Buchan
2006–07: Cowdenbeath W.F.C.
2007–08: Celtic Reserves - 

Regional division champions – league level 3:
2008–09: South-West / West: Glasgow City Reserves - 
2008–09: South-East / Central Musselburgh Windsor

2009: South-West / West Troon
2009: South-East / East / Central Airdrie United

Regional division champions – league level 4:

Seasons

1999–2008
In the season 2000–01, Hamilton Athletic finished top of the 10-team national Second Division.

Arthurlie
Falkirk
GC Wellpark
Hamilton Athletic
Inverness Caledonian Thistle

Inverurie Utd
Livingston
Middlefield WSC
Preston
Whitehill Welfare

Falkirk Ladies had won promotion from the SWFL Third Division in 1999–2000, and they became the Second Division champions in 2002–03, ahead of Dundee City and Civil Service Strollers. Falkirk sealed the title with late-season wins over St. Johnstone away and Dundee City at Brockville.

In 2005–06, the top teams in the division were champions Buchan Girls, Crichton, Cowdenbeath, Arsenal North 2nd LFC and Thistle LFC. Cowdenbeath won the 2006–07 championship.

2007–08 was the last season of the national SWFL Second Division. The member clubs were:

Celtic 'B'
Dundee City
Dunfermline Athletic
East Kilbride Thistle
Hamilton Academical 'B'

Kemnay
F.C. Kilmarnock
Paisley Saints
Maryhill
Tynecastle

2008–2012
After the switch to the three regional divisions (North, East and West) in 2008–09, the Second Division's member clubs were:

North:
Aberdeen University 
Buchan
Dee Vale
Aberdeen University
Buchan
Dons Ladies
Dee Vale
Dundee City 
Dundee University 
Forfar Farmington Lassies 
Glendale Ladies 
Kemnay
Monifieth
SLB Harriers 
Stonehaven Ladies 

West:
Airdrie United (replaced Clyde LFC after two matches)
Glasgow City Reserves
Glasgow Ladies B
Glasgow University 
Hamilton Accies 'B'
Linwood Rangers 
Loudon
Maryhill
Paisley Saints 
Team Strathclyde 
Troon
F.C. Kilmarnock withdrew before the season started

East:
Boroughmuir
Dunfermline Athletic 
East Fife
Hibernian B
Motherwell
Murieston United 
Musselburgh Windsor 
Spartans B
Stenhousemuir Ladies 
St. Johnstone

The Scottish women's football divisions used the autumn–spring season calendar until 2008–09. From the season 2009, they switched to a summer schedule (March–November).

The three-division system continued with the new schedule, in the 2010 and 2011 seasons.

Owing to an influx of new clubs, for the 2012 season the Second Division East was split into two separate East and South-East divisions. The East division was now based around Fife and Tayside while the South-East division was centred on Edinburgh and the Lothians.

Hearts, Hibernian 1875, Falkirk FC and a Spartans Reserve team moved from the East division to the South East in 2012. Boroughmuir Thistle, Football Club of Edinburgh, Leith Athletic, Musselburgh Windsor and Seton Ladies were new clubs.

2011 North champions Buchan Ladies were promoted to the First Division while Dundee City and Forfar Farmington Blues transferred to the East. New clubs were a Buchan Ladies Youth side, Turriff United and Dee Ladies, part of the Dee Boys Club set-up.

2013
Member clubs in the 2013 season:

North Division
No clubs accepted promotion from the 2012 North competition, with champions Stonehaven and runners-up Dee Vale competing again in 2013.

Luthermuir were transferred from the Second Division East where they played in 2012. Elgin City were formerly known as Moray Ladies.

 Aberdeen LFC Development, Aberdeen
 Aberdeen LFC Reserves
 Buchan Ladies Youth, Cruden Bay
 Dee Ladies, Aberdeen
 Dee Vale, Maryculter
 Elgin City, Elgin
 Kemnay, Kemnay
 Luthermuir
 Stonehaven, Stonehaven
 Turriff United, Turriff

East/Central Division
2012 champions Dunfermline Athletic and runners-up East Fife Ladies were promoted to the SWFL First Division, however both clubs entered reserve sides in the Second Division in 2013. East Fife added the suffix Violet after linking up with Cupar Violet GFC.

Raith Rovers were relegated from the 2012 First Division. Falkirk FC were transferred from the South East Division while Stenhousemuir arrived from the West Division. Tayside Ladies, a senior section of Celtic Girls (Tayside), entered for the first time. Arbroath CSC and Monifieth who resigned during the 2012 season did not return.

 Dundee City, Dundee
 Dunfermline 2013, Dunfermline
 East Fife Violet, Levenmouth
 Falkirk FC, Falkirk
 Falkirk LFC Reserves
 Forfar Farmington Ladies
 Jeanfield Swifts, Perth
 Raith Rovers, Kirkcaldy
 Stenhousemuir, Stenhousemuir
 Tayside Ladies, Lochee

South East Division
2012 champions Hearts were promoted to the SWFL First Division but entered a development side in the Second Division in 2013. Edinburgh Caledonia, Hutchison Vale Reserves and Murieston United Reds were new clubs.

 Boroughmuir Thistle
 Edinburgh Caledonia, Edinburgh
 FC Edinburgh Ladies, Edinburgh
 Hearts Development
 Hibernian Development
 Hutchison Vale Reserves
 Leith Athletic, Edinburgh
 Murieston United Reds, Livingston
 Musselburgh Windsor, Musselburgh
 Seton Ladies, Port Seton 
 Spartans Reserves

West/South West Division
2012 champions Murieston United were promoted to the SWFL First Division. Hamilton Caledonian, Irvine Thistle, Kilwinning Development, Mill United and Whitburn joined the league in 2013; EK Galaxy dropped out, while Hamilton Academical Reserves withdrew to play in a new development league.

 Claremont, East Kilbride 
 Dumfries, Dumfries
 Glasgow Girls, Glasgow
 Hamilton Caledonian, Hamilton
 Irvine Thistle, Irvine
 Kilwinning Development
 Mill United, Hamilton
 Stranraer, Stranraer
 Viewfield Rovers, Lochwinnoch
 Whitburn, Whitburn

2017
The following teams played in the SWFL Second Division during the 2017 season. As well as first teams, the SWFL structures also incorporated a number of development or youth teams of other SWPL and SWFL clubs.

North:
Buchan Youth
Buckie Ladies
Deveronvale
Moray Ladies
Ross County
Stonehaven
Turriff United

West:
Ayr United
Bishopton
Dumbarton United
F.C. Kilmarnock 23s
Kilwinning
Morton
Pollok United
Queen of the South
Rutherglen
St Roch's
Stranraer
United Glasgow
Westerlands B

Central:
Airdrie
Blackburn United
Broxburn Athletic Colts
Cumbernauld Colts Development
East Kilbride Girls
Glasgow Girls Development
Hamilton Academical Development
Hawick United
Linlithgow Rose
Motherwell Development
Murieston United
Stenhousemuir

East:
Bayside
Dundee City
East Fife Violet
Edinburgh Caledonia
Edinburgh South
Forfar Farmington Ladies
Hutchison Vale Development
Letham
 Montrose
Raith Rovers
Seton Ladies
Spartans Development

2019
Member clubs in the 2019 season:

North/East:
Buchan Youth
Dryburgh Athletic
Dundee City
Dunfermline Athletic U21s
East Fife Development
Forfar Farmington Women
Granite City Ladies
Jeanfield Swifts Women
Moray
Westdyke Thistle Ladies

Details:

South East/Central:
Airdrie Ladies
Blackburn United Development
Borders Ladies
Edinburgh Caledonia FC
Falkirk
Lothian
Murieston United
Musselburgh Windsor
Stenhousemuir
Stirling University Development

Details:

West/Central:
Bishopton
BSC Glasgow
Clyde FC
Glasgow Girls U23s
Motherwell Development
Pollok United
Renton Craigandro Ladies
St Mirren WFC
United Glasgow
West Park United

Details:

West/South West:
Annan Athletic Ladies FC
Clark Drive Ladies
East Kilbride Thistle Ladies
Gleniffer Thistle
Kilwinning
Mid Annandale Ladies
Morton Women
Rutherglen
Stewarton United Ladies
Stranraer Ladies

Details:

See also
Scottish Women's Football League Second Division Cup

References

External links
Scottish Women's Football
Scottish Women's League results and tables since 1972 at Scottish Football Historical Results Archive

 
3
2019 disestablishments in Scotland
Sports leagues disestablished in 2019
Defunct football leagues in Scotland